The Dr. Ram Manohar Lohia Institute of Medical Sciences (Dr.RMLIMS), is a medical Institute under State Legislature Act with teaching hospital established by the Government of Uttar Pradesh in Gomti Nagar, Lucknow. The institute offers MBBS, DM, MCh, MD and Ph.D. degrees. It was established in 2006 and was affiliated with King George's Medical University for students enrolled till academic year 2018–2019. On 12 September 2018, it was notified an Institute under State Legislature Act with degree-granting status and privileges.

History

Establishment
As an autonomous institute of Uttar Pradesh Government it was established along the lines of the Sanjay Gandhi Post Graduate Institute of Medical Sciences, Lucknow and was given an independent status in 2006.

Starting of degree courses
After establishing in 2006, in 2012 it got Medical Council of India's approval to start post graduate and higher degree courses. In 2017 it got Medical Council of India's approval to run MBBS degree course. It was started as an affiliated college of King George's Medical University.

University status by Institute under State Legislature Act
In 2015, Government of Uttar Pradesh start upgrading it into an Institute under State Legislature Act by passing Dr. Ram Manohar Lohia Institute of Medical Sciences Act 2015 in assembly. But after not getting approval from Governor of Uttar Pradesh for Dr. Ram Manohar Lohia Institute of Medical Sciences Act 2015, the cabinet in 2018 included suggestions given by governor and again started the process by preparing an amendment act. The act was notified on 12 September 2018.

Courses
Currently available MBBS, Short Term student Training for Life sciences, technical & Project work for B Sc & M Sc students, Ph.D Program, Internship for medical students and PG Degree courses (MD/DM/MCh).

Location
The institute is situated in Vibhuti Khand in Gomti Nagar locality of Lucknow.

Departments
Multispeciality Departments of Dr.RMLIMS:

 Anaesthesiology   
 Cardiology    
 Gastrosurgery    
 Gastromedicine 
 Microbiology    
 Nephrology
 Neurology   
 Neurosurgery   
 Nuclear Medicine    
 Pathology
 Radiodiagnosis   
 Radiation Oncology    
 Surgical Oncology
 Urology
 Medical Oncology
 Cardiovascular & Thoracic Surgery
 Emergency Medicine
 Physical Medicine & Rehabilitation
 Pediatric Surgery

References

External links

Institute under State Legislature Act
Medical and health sciences universities in India
Medical colleges in Uttar Pradesh
Universities and colleges in Lucknow
Memorials to Ram Manohar Lohia
Educational institutions established in 2006
2006 establishments in Uttar Pradesh